Southall is a surname, and may refer to

 David Southall, British paediatrician
 Ivan Southall (1921–2008), Australian children's author
 James P. C. Southall (1871–1962), American physicist
 Joseph Southall (1861–1944), Arts and Crafts Movement painter
 Neville Southall (born 1958), Welsh professional footballer
 Mark T. Southall (1911–1976), American politician
 Nicky Southall (born 1972), English professional footballer
 Patricia Southall (born 1970), American former beauty queen
 Tom Southall (1877–1949), New Zealand cricketer

See also
 Southall, a West London suburb 
 Southwell (disambiguation)